Deportivo Toluca Fútbol Club S.A. de C.V., commonly known as Club Deportivo Toluca, is a Mexican football club, playing in Liga MX, the top-flight of Mexican football. Toluca's stadium, Estadio Nemesio Díez Riega is located in Toluca de Lerdo, State of Mexico in Mexico. The team was founded on February 12, 1917 by the brothers Manuel and Francisco Henkel Bros owners of the farm "La Huerta" located in Zinacantepec near of Toluca City.

Toluca has won the Mexican Primera División 10 times, making it the third most winning team, behind América (13) and Guadalajara (12). Besides this, the team has also won two Copa MX and two CONCACAF Champions League. In addition, Toluca won the Mexiquense State Championship 14 times.
Despite being one of the oldest teams in Mexico, with more than 100 years of history, the professional era for Toluca began in 1950, 33 years after its foundation, becoming one of the founding teams of the Segunda División de México and the third team with the most seasons in Mexican First Division. It is together with the Cruz Azul and Club Universidad Nacional, one of the clubs of the current maximum circuit, which since their promotion or appearance, have not relegated or were absent from the maximum circuit.

According to Mitofsky in 2022, Toluca is the seventh most popular team in Mexico with 3.0% preference with around 4.0 million fans.

History

Early years
On 12 February 1917, the brothers Román Alday and Gerardo Ferrat alongside Filiberto Navas and Manuel Henkel created Deportivo Toluca Futbol Club. 
In 1950, the team joined the recently formed Segunda División de México advancing to Mexican Primera División in 1952-53 by having tied with Irapuato by three goals, two by Rubén Pichardo and one by that tournament's goal scorer Mateo de la Tijera having left one more match to play.

The Teams first official First Division game was against Atlante F.C., and Toluca won this by two goals to one.

The team won two consecutive championships in 1966-67 and 1967-68 under coach Ignacio Trelles.
In 1974-75 Toluca won the championship one more time after 23 years, coached by Uruguayan Ricardo de León, Toluca played a style of game that was consistently criticized as ultra-defensive but won the championship by defeating León in the final-four mini-tournament 1–0, with the lone goal being scored by Ecuadorian Ítalo Estupiñan.  This is the only time the Mexican Championship has been decided by a round-robin, two-legged, mini-tournament.

Enrique Meza era
In 1997 Enrique "Ojitos" Meza became the coach of the team, after reaching the finals of the Mexican league with Toros Neza. Toluca resurged, its tactical scheme was very offensive, which was very characteristic of its coach. It was not atypical to see scores like 5–3. The offensive idea suited perfectly the Paraguayan José Saturnino Cardozo, who became the best scorer of the league in four occasions.

On his second tournament with the team, Meza led Toluca to win the championship in the Verano 1998 tournament, the first one in twenty years. Finishing the regular season as leader of the tournament with 33 points, Toluca went on to beat Atlante and América in the quarterfinals and semifinals respectively. Toluca then faced Necaxa at the final.

After losing with the Hidrorrayos in the first leg of the final 1–2 at the Estadio Azteca, Necaxa scored two goals in the first two minutes of the second leg match at the Estadio Nemesio Díez, losing 1–4 at the aggregate score. Toluca then scored five goals with no answer from Necaxa, Taboada at 3', Abundis at 35' and 52', and Cardozo at 58' and 89'. Toluca won the final with a 6–3 aggregate score, winning its fourth title and the first seven titles in the short tournaments era.

For the Invierno 1998, Toluca finished second in the regular season behind Cruz Azul, but was eliminated in the Liguilla's first round, losing 2–3 in the aggregate score against Atlas, seeded 7th.

The next tournament, Verano 1999, Toluca finished as leader of the tournament again with a record of 12 wins, 3 draws and losing only 2 matches, against Santos Laguna and Atlas. The team defeated Necaxa and Santos Laguna in the quarterfinals and semifinals, respectively. Toluca went on to play the final against Atlas, second best team of the regular season.

After two thrilling matches, a 3–3 draw on the first leg at Estadio Jalisco and a 2–2 tie on the second leg at the Estadio Nemesio Díez, the championship was defined in penalties; Toluca won 5–4.

With Enrique Meza as coach, Toluca won the championship three times in a period of three years. Meza left the team in October 2000 to manage Mexico national football team.

Golden era in short tournaments
In the Invierno 2001 tournament Ricardo La Volpe became the coach of Toluca. He, along with Cardozo and Vicente Sánchez had one of the most successful and exciting teams in years. However, La Volpe left Toluca with a few weeks left in the season, but without him, they still won their 7th title.

At the end of the Apertura 2005 tournament, the team became champions again, beating Monterrey by an aggregate of 6–3, after the questionable decisions of Mexican referee Marco Rodriguez "El Chiquidracula", who expelled three players from Monterrey on their first foul committed.

In Apertura 2006, they tied in the first leg (1-1) but suffered a loss in the Estadio Nemesio Díez (2-1) against Guadalajara.

In the Clausura 2007 tournament, Toluca had one of their worst seasons, finishing in last place. In the Copa Libertadores 2007, they made it to the round of 16, where they were subsequently eliminated by Cúcuta Deportivo from Colombia. Following the elimination from both tournaments, Gallego resigned from his position stating the need for a year off as his reason for resigning from Club Toluca. José Pekerman, former coach of the Argentine national team, was appointed as head coach of Club Toluca on May 30, 2007.

Club Toluca failed to qualify for the 2008 Copa Libertadores. On the Apertura 2008, Toluca had a weak start under their new coach, Jose Manuel "El Chepo" De La Torre, on one point going on a four-game streak of only draws. On the last five games of the regular season, they reversed the tying streak, making 13 points out of a possible 15, ending the regular season in 2nd place overall with 27 points and thus advancing to the playoffs. Their goalkeeper Hernan Cristante set a record by not allowing any goals for 773 minutes.

Toluca would go on to win the Bicentenario 2010 tournament by beating Santos Laguna in a dramatic penalty shoot-out, earning them the tenth cup win, the same amount as Club América. Besides winning the domestic title ten times, Toluca has also been the Runner-Up of the Mexican domestic tournament six times. On the Apertura 2012, Toluca finished first place and therefore earned a place for the Copa Libertadores. On the Ligullia of the Apertura 2012, Toluca went all the way to the final and lose to Club Tijuana 4-1 aggregate. On the Cluasura 2013, Toluca finished 13th and did not qualify for the Ligullia. At the end of that season then coach Enrique Meza resigned his job. The next day Toluca contacted its top scorer former player José Cardozo as its new head coach.

The decade without titles
On May 31, 2016, José Luis Real is presented as director of sports development and a new project is presented as technical director, headed by Hernán Cristante, who would arrive with another reference of the club such as Enrique Alfaro together with Joaquín Velázquez as his technical assistants, during the process, Antonio Naelso was to end his successful career within the club, then he managed to bring the goalkeeper on loan Luis García as the only transfer, with a solid base within the club after the losses of Richard Ortiz, Christian Cueva, Heriberto Vidales and Lucas Lobos at the end of the contract, and Liborio Sánchez, Christian Pérez, Mario Quezada, Nicolás Saucedo and Omar Arellano who ended their loan, other players were Daniel González and Héctor Acosta who were loaned to Chiapas and Alebrijes in the same order, were not incorporated into the current team and their loans to other teams were renewed Chivas and Venados F.C. respectively, while the team was in the preseason, David Rangel joined the coaching staff who will achieve as a player of the institution to be captain and champion in the years 1998, 1999, and 2000 with Enrique Alfaro and with Hernán Cristante in 1999 and 2000, while in 2005 he also won the title with Sinha.

For the part of foreign player transfers for the Apertura 2016, an old acquaintance would arrive again, who was champion at the club in 2010, the Chilean Osvaldo González, plus the Brazilian Maikon Leite who previously in 2014 played in Mexico for Atlas FC; other transfers were Rodrigo Gómez , Pablo Barrientos, Antonio Pedroza, and Jesús Méndez.

Deportivo Toluca found themselves playing at home at the Estadio Universitario Alberto "Chivo" Córdoba, because Estadio Nemesio Díez was undergoing remodeling work for the next celebration of 100 years. Starting Clausura 2017, Estadio Nemesio Díez fully ready, Rodrigo Salinas, Gabriel Hauche, Efraín Velarde, and Rubens Sambueza arrived as transfers. In that tournament they reached the semifinals where they were eliminated by Club Deportivo Guadalajara, which ultimately became the champion. Later in the Apertura 2017 tournament they reached the quarterfinals as fifth place, being defeated by Monarcas Morelia. By 2018, there were surprising transfers of Luis Quiñones, Leonel Lopez and Angel Reyna. They reached the final of the Copa MX, being defeated by Club Necaxa. While in the league tournament Toluca was the general leader, dramatically eliminating Morelia in the quarterfinals, in the semifinals they beat Club Tijuana and in the final they faced Santos Laguna, a team they had already beaten in the late years 2000 and 2010. This time the "laguneros" were the champions with an aggregate score of 3–2.

For Apertura 2018, Toluca signed William da Silva, Adolfo Dominguez, Amaury Escoto, Richard Ruiz, Luis Ángel Mendoza, Héctor Acosta, Fernando Tobio and the return of Enrique Triverio, during the tournament he spent all 17 days in Liguilla positions, to culminate 7th. In the quarterfinals they faced America, who would ultimately be champion, being eliminated by a 5-4 aggregate. In the following tournament Cristante is kept, in his first two matches the team remains as Super Leader, but then there was a streak of 6 games without a win, 5 losses and a draw. In which Cristante was dismissed and his replacement was Ricardo La Volpe who began his second stage, during the La Volpe stage there was improvement, but it was not possible to qualify for the league.

During the 2019 Apertura, La Volpe remained in the technical direction, but his results did not improve, having his worst results since 2001. La Volpe resigned in the absence of a day to complete and the team finished in third to last position with 17 points.

For the 2020 Clausura, the tournament was temporarily suspended as of March 15, and after having decided to play the matches on matchday 10 behind closed doors, all as a consequence of the health contingency due to the COVID-19 pandemic in Mexico. The postponement of the contest reached a critical point, until on May 22, 2020, the Liga MX Extraordinary Assembly decreed the end of the tournament before its regular date, leaving the competition without a champion. Toluca finished the tournament in the 15th position, product of 2 wins, 4 draws and 4 losses, obtaining 10 points.

For the Guardianes 2020 and 2021 tournaments, Toluca finished in the 11th position, so it had to play reclassification to a single game, facing Tigres, losing 2-1 in Monterrey, with this result, Toluca ended its participation in the tournament. For the next tournament, Toluca finished again in the eleventh position, again playing reclassification to a single match, this time they faced the current champion León, being a complicated match, again visitor due to their position in the table, they won in a round of penalties, after drawing 2-2 in regular time, winning on penalties 2-4, accessing the quarterfinals, facing Cruz Azul, In a fairly disputed match, round trip ended in the Aztec stadium, losing 4-3 in favor of Cruz Azul and in this way Toluca culminated its participation in the tournament, highlighting the individual scoring championship of Toluqueño player Alexis Canelo with 11 annotations.

For the Apertura 2021 tournament, Toluca made a more remarkable performance than the previous tournaments, culminating in position number 6, playing reclassification again, but this time locally, although it did not help much, since Toluca was defeated by Pumas with a score 1-2 in the match at the Nemesio Diez, culminating again in a reclassification match.

Sponsorship

Kit manufacturers and sponsors

Additional club sponsors and partners
  Aeropuerto Internacional de Toluca
  Aeroméxico
  Arabela
  Casino Caliente
  Corona
  Izzi Telecom
  Coca-Cola
  Powerade
  Mercedes-Benz

Personnel

Management

Coaching staff

Players

First-team squad

Out on loan

Reserve teams

Deportivo Toluca F.C. (Liga TDP)
Reserve team that plays in the Liga TDP, the fourth level of the Mexican league system.

World Cup players
The following players have represented their country at the World Cup whilst playing for Toluca:

  Carlos Carus (1954)
  Jorge Romo (1958)
  Enrique Sesma (1958)
  Manuel Camacho (1958)
  Carlos Blanco (1958)
  Alfredo del Águila (1962)
  Pedro Romero (1962)
  José Vantolrá (1970)
  Rigoberto Cisneros (1978)
  Javier Cárdenas (1978)
  Mario Medina (1978)
  Marcelino Bernal (1994)
  Jorge Rodríguez (1994)
  Fabián Estay (1998)
  Jaime Ordiales (1998)
  José Cardozo (1998, 2002)
  Salvador Carmona (1998, 2002)
  Rafael García (2002)
 Sinha (2006)
  Paulo da Silva (2006)
  Miguel Ángel Ponce (2014)
  Isaác Brizuela (2014)
  Alfredo Talavera (2014, 2018)

Olympic players
The following players have represented their country at the Summer Olympic Games whilst playing for Toluca:

 Albino Morales (1964, 1968)
 Vicente Pereda (1968)
 Jorge Arévalo (1968)
 Alberto Macías (1992)
 Enrique Alfaro (1996)
 José Manuel Abundis (1996)
 Israel López (2004) 
 Sinha (2004)
 Sergio Amaury Ponce (2004)
 José Cardozo (2004)
 Alfredo Talavera (2016)
 Jordan Silva (2016)

Honours

Domestic

 Primera División / Liga MX
 Winners (10): 1966–67, 1967–68, 1974–75, Verano 1998, Verano 1999, Verano 2000, Apertura 2002, Apertura 2005, Apertura 2008, Bicentenario 2010
 Runners Up (8):1956-57, 1957-58, 1970-71, Invierno 2000, Apertura 2006, Apertura 2012, Clausura 2018, Apertura 2022

 Copa México / Copa MX
 Winners (2): 1955–56, 1988–89
 Runners Up (2):1960-61, Clausura 2018

 Campeon de Campeones
 Winners (4): 1967, 1968, 2003, 2006
 Runners Up (3):1955-56, 1974–75, 1988-89

 Segunda División / Liga Premier
 Winners (1): 1952–53

Amateur

 Campeonato Estatal Mexiquense
 Winners (14):  1918-19, 1920–21, 1924–25, 1926–27, 1927-28 1928-29, 1931–32, 1932–33, 1934–35, 1936–37, 1939–40, 1943–44, 1944-45 1945-46.

 Liga Mayor de Fútbol del Estado de México
 Winners (6): 1933-34, 1935–36, 1937–38, 1938–39, 1942–43, 1943-44.
 Runners Up (1): 1930-31

 Liga Mayor de Primera Fuerza
 Winners (1): 1941-42.

 Liga Mayor de Segunda Fuerza
 Winners (1): 1940-41.

 Liga Mayor de Tercera Fuerza
 Winners (1): 1946-47.

 Liga Menor de Futbol
 Winners (1): 1942-43.

 Campeonato de Reservas
 Winners (1): 1945-46.

 Liga Municipal de Toluca
 Winners (1): 1950-51.

Continental
CONCACAF Champions' Cup / Champions League
Winners (2): 1968, 2003
 Runners Up (3): 1998, 2006, 2013–14
 Copa Interamericana
 Runners Up (1):1968

Managers

 Gaspar Rubio (1958–59)
 Árpád Fekete (1965–66)
 Ignacio Trelles (1966–68)
 Ricardo de León (1974–75)
 Luiz Carlos Peters (1975–76)
 José Gomes Nogueira (1976–77)
 José Vela (1977)
 Jorge Marik (1977–82)
 José Antonio Roca (1982–84)
 José Luis Estrada (1984–85)
 Árpád Fekete (1986)
 Roberto Matosas (1986–87)
 Ignacio Jáuregui (1987–88)
 Héctor Sanabria (1988–89)
 Raúl Cárdenas (1989–91)
 Mario Velarde (1991–92)
 José Vantolrá (1992–93)
 Roberto Silva Parada (1993–94)
 José Pascuttini (1994–95)
 Luis Garisto (1995)
 Miguel Ángel López (1996)
 Juan Manuel Álvarez Álvarez (1996–97)
 Enrique Meza (Aug 28, 1997–Oct 1, 2000, Jan 1, 2005–April 10, 2005, July 1, 2012 – May 7, 2013)
 Ricardo Ferrero (Oct 2000–Dec 00)
 Héctor Hugo Eugui (Jan 2001–July 1)
 Ricardo Lavolpe (July 1, 2001–Oct 26, 2002)
 Wilson Graniolatti (Oct 2002–Dec 02, Jan 1, 2012–June 30, 2012)
 Alberto Jorge (Dec 2002–Sept 03)
 Ricardo Ferretti (Sept 30, 2003–Dec 31, 2004)
 Pablo Luna (April 12, 2005 – June 30, 2005)
 Américo Gallego (July 1, 2005 – June 30, 2007)
 José Pekerman (July 1, 2007 – May 30, 2008)
 José Manuel de la Torre (July 1, 2008–Dec 31, 2010)
 Sergio Lugo (Jan 1, 2011–June 30, 2011)
 Héctor Eugui (July 1, 2011–Dec 31, 2011)
 José Cardozo (May 8, 2013 – May 8, 2016)
 Hernán Cristante (May 31, 2016 – February 24, 2019, December 1, 2020 - November 29, 2021)
 Ricardo La Volpe (March 4, 2019 – November 11, 2019)
 José Manuel de la Torre (November 18, 2019 – September 28, 2020)
 Carlos Adrián Morales (September 28, 2020 – November 25, 2020)
 Ignacio Ambriz (December 1, 2021 - )

Records

Top goalscorers in a season

Appearances and Goals

References

External links

 Website
 Facebook
 Twitter
 TikTok
 YouTube

 
Toluca
1917 establishments in Mexico
Sports teams in the State of Mexico
T
Toluca